The Yugoslav Super Cup was an annual football match played between the title holders of the Yugoslav First League and Yugoslav Cup.

Finals by year

Two-legged format

Single match format

References

Defunct football competitions in Yugoslavia
Defunct national association football supercups